Monroe Township is one of twelve townships in Adams County, Indiana. As of the 2010 census, its population was 4,858.

Geography

Cities, towns, villages
 Berne (south half)
 Monroe (north half)

Adjacent townships
 Washington Township (north)
 St. Marys Township (northeast)
 Blue Creek Township (east)
 Wabash Township (south)
 Hartford Township (southwest)
 French Township (west)
 Kirkland Township (northwest)

Cemeteries
The township contains these four cemeteries: Graber, Mazelin, Ray, Smith, and Winchester.

Major highways

Airports and landing strips
 Sprungers South Adams County Airstrip

School districts
 Adams Central Community Schools
 South Adams Schools

Political districts
 Indiana's 6th congressional district
 State House District 79
 State Senate District 19

References
 
 United States Census Bureau 2007 TIGER/Line Shapefiles
 United States National Atlas

External links
 Indiana Township Association
 United Township Association of Indiana

Townships in Adams County, Indiana
Townships in Indiana